Tim Preece (born 5 August 1938) is an English actor. He has appeared on British television since the 1960s and also acted on stage.

Early life
Preece was born in Shrewsbury in Shropshire and was educated at the Priory Grammar School for Boys, Shrewsbury. He trained as an actor at the Bristol Old Vic.

Career
Preece's television roles include playing Codal in the six-part Doctor Who serial Planet of the Daleks (1973) and Tom Patterson in the first two series of The Fall and Rise of Reginald Perrin (1976–77). He later returned to the role for The Legacy Of Reginald Perrin (1996). He also appeared as the editor of a local newspaper in "The Journalist", an episode of People Like Us (2001) with Chris Langham. Preece played the recurring role of Rev. Sparrow in Waiting for God (1992–94).

Other television appearances include the Foyle's War episode "War Games" (2003) as James Philby, the pilot of a doomed holiday jet in the Casualty episode "Cascade" (1992), and as Mark's careers guidance counsellor and therapist in the Peep Show episode "Dream Job" (2003).

In 2017, Preece appeared in a Royal National Theatre production of the improvised play Lost Without Words.

Selected filmography
 Crossplot (1969)
 Out of the Trees (1976, TV)
 Brimstone and Treacle (1982)
 Vanity Fair (2004)
 Elizabeth: The Golden Age (2007)
 The Ghost Writer (2010)

References

External links

Amanda Howard Associates

1938 births
Living people
Actors from Shrewsbury
Alumni of Bristol Old Vic Theatre School
English male stage actors
English male television actors